Swan Lake Township is a township in Pocahontas County, Iowa, USA.

History
Swan Lake Township was established in 1871. It is named from Swan Lake, a lake which is said to resemble the body of a swan.

References

Townships in Pocahontas County, Iowa
Townships in Iowa